Four by the Beach Boys (stylized as 4-By the Beach Boys) is the first EP by American rock band the Beach Boys, released September 1964 by Capitol Records. It consists of four selections from the album All Summer Long (June 1964). "Wendy" and "Little Honda" received enough airplay to enter the Billboard Hot 100. They peaked at #44 and #65, respectively.
Four remains their only EP released in the United States (discounting the Holland bonus EP Mount Vernon and Fairway).

Track listing
All tracks written by Brian Wilson and Mike Love, except "Hushabye" by Doc Pomus and Mort Shuman.

Side one
"Wendy" – 2:05
"Don't Back Down" – 2:00

Side two
"Little Honda" – 2:33
"Hushabye" – 1:53

References

The Beach Boys EPs
1964 EPs
Capitol Records EPs